Minuscule 650 (in the Gregory-Aland numbering), ε 399 (von Soden), is a Greek minuscule manuscript of the New Testament, on parchment. Palaeographically it has been assigned to the 12th century. The manuscript is lacunose. Scrivener labelled it by 726e.

Description 

The codex contains the text of the four Gospels, on 219 parchment leaves (size ), with some lacunae (Matthew 1:1-10:1; Luke 23:56; John 1:1-18). The text is written in one column per page, 18-24 lines per page.

Text 

The Greek text of the codex is a representative of the Byzantine text-type. Kurt Aland placed it in Category V.
Wisse did not examine its text by using his Profile Method.

History 

F. H. A. Scrivener and C. R. Gregory dated the manuscript to the 13th century. Currently the manuscript is dated by the INTF to the 12th century.

Formerly the manuscript was held in Constantinople (Hellenikou Philologikou Sullogou 5). The manuscript was added to the list of New Testament manuscripts by Scrivener. Gregory saw the manuscript in 1886.

The manuscript currently is housed at the Turkish Historical Society (5), at Ankara.

See also 

 List of New Testament minuscules
 Biblical manuscript
 Textual criticism
 Minuscule 649

References

Further reading 

 

Greek New Testament minuscules
12th-century biblical manuscripts